Karin Søraunet (born 1 July 1967) is a Norwegian politician for the Christian Democratic Party.

She served as a deputy representative to the Norwegian Parliament from Nord-Trøndelag during the term 2001–2005.

On the local level Søraunet is the mayor of Vikna since 2005.

References

1967 births
Living people
Deputy members of the Storting
Christian Democratic Party (Norway) politicians
Mayors of places in Nord-Trøndelag
Women mayors of places in Norway
20th-century Norwegian women politicians
20th-century Norwegian politicians
Women members of the Storting